Khashan (also Romanized as Khashān; also known as Shahīd Chamrān and Shahīd Doktor Chamrān) is a village in Hoseynabad Rural District, in the Central District of Shush County, Khuzestan Province, Iran. At the 2006 census, its population was 768, in 100 families.

References 

Populated places in Shush County